Vincent "Vinny" Staples (born 1945) is an Irish former hurler who enjoyed a successful career as a right wing-back with the Wexford senior team.

Born in Piercestown, County Wexford, Staples was introduced to hurling in his youth. He experienced championship successes in the junior and intermediate grades with the St Martin's club.

Staples made his debut on the inter-county scene at the age of seventeen when he first linked up with the Wexford minor team. An All-Ireland medal winner in this grade he later won an All-Ireland medal with the under-21 team. Staples made his senior debut during the 1965 championship. He went on to play a key role for Wexford in defence during a successful era, and won one All-Ireland medal, two Leinster medals and one National Hurling League medal. Staples was an All-Ireland runner-up on one occasion.

Staples retired from inter-county hurling following the conclusion of the 1974 championship.

Honours
St Martin's
Wexford Intermediate Hurling Championship (2): 1964, 1977
Wexford Junior Hurling Championship (1): 1963

Wexford
All-Ireland Senior Hurling Championship (1): 1968
Leinster Senior Hurling Championship (4): 1965, 1968
National Hurling League (1): 1966–67
All-Ireland Under-21 Hurling Championship (1): 1965
Leinster Under-21 Hurling Championship (3): 1964, 1965, 1966
All-Ireland Minor Hurling Championship (1): 1963
Leinster Minor Hurling Championship (1): 1963

References

1945 births
Living people
St Martin's (Wexford) hurlers
Wexford inter-county hurlers
All-Ireland Senior Hurling Championship winners